Mark Edward Wilkinson is an English-Australian singer-songwriter.

melodious and soul musician

he started music early ages with the support from his family

Early life
Wilkinson was born in England, but his family later emigrated to Singapore and then to Australia when he was four years old. He was educated at Sydney Grammar School and went on to complete a Bachelor of Arts/Commerce degree at the University of Sydney. During university, Wilkinson learned how to play the acoustic guitar.

Career 

In 2006, Wilkinson independently released his debut EP, Cellophane Life.  This unpolished 6 track collection provided an introduction to Wilkinson's lyrical hand and emotive sound.  The title track along with "Baptism By Fire" elevated Mark as a finalist in Commercial Radio Australia's coveted New Artist To Radio competition.

Following on in 2007, Wilkinson hit the road with then current Australian Idol winner Damien Leith, performing to thousands across the country.  Shortly after, he came to the attention of Peer Music, the world's largest independent music publisher, and subsequently signed a global deal.

Kicking off 2008, Wilkinson set out on the road again, headlining shows along the east coast of Australia.  He then set off to Europe for two months, performing across Ireland, England, France, and Germany; teaming up with songwriter Adam Argyle (Melanie C, Newton Faulkner, Wes Carr); and working with David Gray's team in his London studio.  The success of the European tour saw Wilkinson invited to return as part of the Popkomm conference in Berlin, where he showcased to industry members from around the globe.

Wilkinson returned to Australia to finish his follow-up EP, Counting Down the Hours, which delivered a more polished, fully produced side to his music.  The title track along with "Keep Fighting" once again placed him as a finalist in the New Artist to Radio competition, with Wilkinson going on to receive airplay on various commercial and community stations across the country.

In early 2009, Wilkinson was invited to perform for deployed Australian troops serving in the Solomon Islands. In an effort to make more of his music publicly available, Wilkinson launched a campaign called 'A Year of YouTube' beginning in April. The premise of the campaign being to release an original song each week over the course of a year.  With Wilkinson's live reputation continuing to grow, he signed on with the Harbour Agency, Australia's largest booking agency. This relationship was solidified with Sydney residencies, where Wilkinson performed week after week, and followed on with a national tour supporting Diesel.

The following year, 2010, launched in similar fashion with Wilkinson touring Australia supporting Michael Bolton. This quickly followed up with more tours alongside Ian Moss (Cold Chisel), Jon Stevens (Noiseworks), and Shannon Noll, before heading to China to represent Australia and perform at World Expo. Wilkinson then finished the year performing at arenas around the country alongside Brian Wilson, Chicago, America, and Peter Frampton.

Meanwhile, with sales of his EPs, available only at shows and exceeding 20,000 copies, Wilkinson returned to the studio to record his debut album Truth Came Running with producer Sean Carey, guitarist for the band Thirsty Merc.  With its release in March 2011, Wilkinson returned to the road, while lead single "All I Ever Wanted" had been receiving radio and television play on stations across the country. The film clip for "All I Ever Wanted" was shot on the streets of Cape Town, South Africa by photographer Adrian Steirn and his 21 Icons Global Project team.

October 2011 marked the release of Wilkinson's third EP, Sweet White Lies. Lead single "My Friend" received radio play across the nation, and he hit the road again for his A Friend on the Road tour. During 2011, Wilkinson also supported Boyce Avenue on their Australian tour, and performed for VIPs at Kings of Leon's show at Allphones Arena, Sydney.

In early 2012, Wilkinson released Live at the Basement, a live album recorded at The Basement (Sydney) during the A Friend on the Road tour. He returned to the road in March 2012 for his Caught in a Moment national tour. Shortly after this tour, Wilkinson released a solo acoustic album titled Hand Picked and performed a handful of shows in churches in Sydney and Melbourne.

Coinciding with the release of his single "Benny's on the Rooftop" from his then-forthcoming album Let the River Run in October 2012, Wilkinson set off on his Benny's on the Rooftop Tour, performing at venues across the country. Wilkinson began pre-production for his second studio album in November 2012, working with producer Ollie McGill (The Cat Empire). The album, entitled Let the River Run was released in August 2013, and shot to No. 2 on the Australian iTunes singer-songwriter album chart and No. 20 overall on the Australian iTunes album chart. The album hit No. 1 on iTunes charts in November 2013. The album was mastered at the Abby Lane Studios in London and distributed by MGM in Australia and New Zealand, with worldwide digital distribution.

Tours

Wilkinson previewed Let the River Run in April 2013 at five shows in Sydney, two shows in London, and shows in Berlin and Dublin. He kicked off a world tour in August 2013 to support the release, with shows across Australia and debut tour dates in the U.S.

In 2014, Wilkinson completed his largest tour across Australia, with a follow-up theatre tour in capital cities. During the European leg of the tour, Wilkinson was discovered in the Netherlands by Humberto Tan while busking in Dam Square in the afternoon to a large audience that had assembled. Tan invited him to be a guest on his talk show, RTL Late Night, where Wilkinson was given very positive remarks by Dutch artists. He was allowed to perform for a couple of minutes at the end of the show and as a result his name started trending on social media and his music began charting in the Netherlands.

In October 2015, Wilkinson returned to the U.S. for tour dates in San Francisco; Portland, Oregon; Boston; Atlanta; Nashville, Tennessee; and New York City for another showcase at CMJ. The following December, Wilkinson released Hand Picked Vol. 2, the second in his acoustic series, which debuted at No. 2 on iTunes singer-songwriter charts. Shortly after, in February 2016, Wilkinson released the EP Come with Me Tonight, a preview of his forthcoming third studio album. Rolling Stone premiered the first official video for "Another Necklace" from Come with Me Tonight.

Wilkinson kicked off a world tour to support the album in May 2016 with dates across Australia, New Zealand, Europe, the UK, and the U.S. in September 2016, with dates in New York, Atlanta, Boston, and Nashville, including shows at venues such as the Bluebird Café.

Wilkinson has performed across Australia, New Zealand, Europe and the U.S. He has opened arena and major theatre tours nationally for artists including Eric Clapton, Peter Frampton, Brian Wilson, Chicago, America, and Seal, among others. He has performed for VIPs at Kings of Leon and Santana concerts, represented Australia at the World Expo in China, and entertained deployed troops in the Solomon Islands. Wilkinson has also headlined European tours, performing to capacity crowds in London, Paris, and Berlin. It was on one such trip that brought Wilkinson to the attention of David Gray's producer, Iestyn Polson, and he was invited to record in Gray's Church Studio with his band backing Mark up.

In a review of Wilkinson's set during his 2013 world tour, The Music wrote, "His voice is supreme and crisp...Wilkinson is one of the rare artists whose vocals embody a kind of charisma that pulls you in and forces you to do the rarest thing in the world...feel."

Discography

Albums

Extended plays

References 

Australian singer-songwriters
Australian guitarists
Australian buskers
English male singers
English emigrants to Australia
Living people
Year of birth missing (living people)
Australian male guitarists
Australian male singer-songwriters